{|
{{Infobox ship image
|Ship image=Suffren-IMG 8647.jpg
|Ship caption=1/20th scale model of Suffren, lead ship of Castigliones class, on display at the Musée national de la Marine
}}

|}Castiglione''' was ordered as a third-rank, 90-gun sailing  for the French Navy, but was converted to a steam-powered ship in the 1850s while under construction. Completed in 1861 the ship participated in the Second French intervention in Mexico the following year. She was converted into a troopship in 1866 and was hulked in 1881, serving as a barracks ship until she was scrapped in 1900.

Description
The Suffren-class ships were enlarged versions of the 80-gun  ships of the line that had been designed by naval architect Jacques-Noël Sané. The conversion to steam power involved cutting Castigliones frame in half amidships and building a new section to house the propulsion machinery and coal bunkers. Her crew numbered 913 officers and ratings. Details are lacking on her propulsion machinery, the only information available is that her two steam engines were rated at 800 nominal horsepower and produced  which gave her a speed of  during her sea trials.

The ship's armament consisted of eighteen 30-pounder smoothbore cannon and sixteen  Paixhans guns on the lower gundeck and thirty-four 30-pounder cannon on the upper gundeck. On the quarterdeck and forecastle were twenty  Paixhans guns and a pair of 163 mm rifled muzzle-loading guns.

Construction and careerCastiglione was laid down in October 1835 at the Arsenal de Toulon. She was ordered to be converted to steam power on 19 October 1854. The conversion began on 2 January 1856 and the ship was launched on 4 July 1860. Castiglione was commissioned on 15 July although her sea trials did not begin until May 1861.Castiglione'' took part in the French intervention in Mexico in 1862. She was struck on 11 October 1881 and used as a barracks hulk. She was eventually broken up in 1900.

Citations

References

Ships of the line of the French Navy
Ships built in France
1860 ships
Crimean War naval ships of France
Suffren-class ships of the line